The Zulfikar family (aliases: آل ذو الفقار) is an Egyptian family. They have had an influence in the late 16th century to modern times.

It is known that more than one Zulfikar has been either a ruler of Egypt or prince in Egyptian Mamluk era. The family had produced a large number of military officers from the 19th to the late-20th century. The Zulfikar family has also contributed to modern Egyptian art through the works of filmmaker Ezz El-Dine Zulfikar, filmmaker Mahmoud Zulfikar, actor Salah Zulfikar, poet Magda Zulfikar, among others.

History 
Sources indicate that the Zulfikar family were already well established in Cairo by the late 16th century. Many elders held the title of either prince, pasha or bey in the Mamluk era. Also sources indicate that other Zulfikars sat on the Majlis created by Ibrahim Pasha.

Ahmed Pasha Zulfikar is widely considered to be the modern founding father of the family. Other Zulfikars received various titles, such as prince, pasha, Bek, and hanim. On the occasion of the Egyptian Revolution of 1952, the Zulfikar family contributed in fighting against the British occupation with many members in the Egyptian Armed Forces and Egyptian National Police during the 19th and the 20th centuries.

Notable members 
Notable family members include Mohammed Bek Zulfikar, Ahmed Mourad Bey Zulfikar, who served as Senior Cairo police commissioner in early 1940s. With a majority of a militarized background, such as Major general Kamal Zulfikar in the Egyptian Armed Forces, others switched careers to filmmaking in the mid 20th century such as Ezz El-Dine Zulficar, who was also a military officer in the Egyptian Armed Forces, a friend of many of major Free Officers Movement, had a career shift in 1947. He presented patriotic films after Egyptian revolution of 1952. He is regarded one of the most influential filmmakers in Egyptian cinema.

Salah Zulfikar was one of Egypt's heroes in its battle against the occupation while serving in the Egyptian National Police. He became an actor in 1956, a film producer in 1958. He starred in over hundred films. He is regarded as one of his country's most iconic male performers in the 20th century. Mahmoud Zulfikar was a film director, actor, producer and screenwriter. He was a major cinematic figure in Egyptian film industry.

In the business world, notable Zulfikar family members include Ahmed Bek Zulfikar, Abbas Helmi Bek Zulfikar, Mohammed Zulfikar, Mamdouh Zulfikar among others worked at multiple business fields. Ahmed Zulfikar was an Egyptian entrepreneur. He was one of the first founders of the modern irrigation systems technology in Egypt.

Notable members of the family include Mona Zulfikar, she is a prominent lawyer and human rights activist and was included in the Forbes 2021 list of the "100 most powerful businesswomen in the Arab region". Ezz El-Dine Zulfikar's daughter, Dina Zulfikar, is an environmentalist and active member of Egypt's animal rights community, having co-founded the country's first and largest animal rights organization, the Society for Protection of Animal Rights in Egypt.

See also 
 Zulfiqar (disambiguation)
 Cairo Governorate

References 

Egyptian families
Egyptian culture
Arab culture
Egyptian pashas
Egyptian revolutionaries
Egyptian nationalists